Caloptilia bryonoma is a moth of the family Gracillariidae. It is known from New South Wales, Australia.

The wingspan is about 10 mm. Adults have a fringe on the trailing edge of each wing. The fore wings have a pattern of light and dark brown markings. The hind wings are a uniform dark brown.

The larvae feed on Nothofagus moorei. They probably mine the leaves of their host plant.

References

bryonoma
Moths of Australia
Moths described in 1914